The 2016–17 Texas A&M Aggies women's basketball team represented Texas A&M University in the 2016–17 NCAA Division I women's basketball season. The team's head coach was Gary Blair, who is in his fourteenth season at Texas A&M. The team plays their home games at the Reed Arena in College Station, Texas and will play in its fifth season as a member of the Southeastern Conference. They finished the season 22–12, 9–7 in SEC play to finish in sixth place. They defeated Florida and Missouri before losing to Mississippi State in the semifinals of the SEC women's tournament. They received an at-large bid to the NCAA women's basketball tournament, where they defeated Penn in the first round after rallying from 21 points down, before losing to UCLA in the second round.

Roster

Rankings

Schedule and Results

|-
!colspan=12 style="background:#500000; color:#FFFFFF;"| Exhibition

|-
!colspan=12 style="background:#500000; color:#FFFFFF;"| Non-conference regular season

|-
!colspan=12 style="background:#500000; color:#FFFFFF;"| Conference Games

|-
!colspan=12 style="background:#500000;"| SEC Women's Tournament

|-
!colspan=12 style="background:#500000;"| NCAA tournament

See also
 2016–17 Texas A&M Aggies men's basketball team

References

Texas A&M Aggies women's basketball seasons
Texas AandM
Texas AandM Aggies women's basketball
Texas AandM Aggies women's basketball
Texas AandM